The Republic of the Congo competed at the 1996 Summer Olympics in Atlanta, United States.

Results per event

Athletics

Men 

Track and road events

Women 

Track and road events

Judo 

Men

Swimming 

Men

Women

References
Official Olympic Reports

External links
 

Nations at the 1996 Summer Olympics
1996
1996 in the Republic of the Congo